Mamu (also Romanized as Māmū; also known as Māmū-ye Bālā and Māmū-ye ‘Olyā) is a village in Kakavand-e Gharbi Rural District, Kakavand District, Delfan County, Lorestan Province, Iran. At the 2006 census, its population was 72, in 10 families.

References 

Towns and villages in Delfan County